Sonny Leonard Grootscholten (born February 24, 1994), better known by his stage name Asonn, is a Dutch electronic musician, record producer, songwriter, remixer and DJ. He gained recognition after collaborating with Bobby Burns on their single "Sahara".

Biography

Early life 
Grootscholten was born on February 24, 1994 in Honselersdijk, Netherlands. When he was six he started playing drums, keyboard and flute. He also developed an interest in progressive house when he heard "Save The. world" by Swedish House Mafia and taught himself how to make his own music by downloading specialist software, FL Studio, and enabling him to start composing.

Music career 
Asonn began his career in 2014, when he was 20 years old and his official first release was the single "Drumrave", a collaboration with Jacob van Hage which was released on Laidback Luke’s Mixmash Records on November 27, 2014. In December 2015, he released a remix of "Satellites" by Bobby Burns featuring Hannah Robinson on Spinnin’ Records. Shortly afterwards he released his most recognized single “Sahara” with Bobby Burns on Afrojack’s Wall Recordings. He then collaborated with No Mondays to release “Pyro” featuring MC Ambush. Asonn participated on the Armada Ibiza 2016 compilation with his single “Shaigon” with Jimmy Clash. It was followed by his fifth and sixth single “Banga” and “Home Is Where The Heart Is” both released on Hardwell's Revealed Recordings in collaboration with Thomas Newson (known from his #1 hit single “Flute”). Asonn's single "Running" was released on November 22, 2019. Early 2020, Asonn released “Save Me”, “Oslo Opera” and “Want That”. The singles "Oslo Opera" and "Want That" released on Smash The House, label of Belgian DJ duo Dimitri Vegas & Like Mike. Sonny also produced the Heineken UEFA Champions League Ibiza Final 2015 Commercial. He is well known for co-producing and co-writing for highly valued artists.

Asonn performed his first big show at worldwide dance festival “Don't Let Daddy Know” making his debut in the Ziggo Dome in Amsterdam in 2016 alongside Steve Angello, Don Diablo, R3hab and Sunnery James & Ryan Marciano. His first international performance followed at “Don't Let Daddy Know” in Edinburgh, Scotland alongside Nicky Romero, Showtek, Bassjackers, Laidback Luke and Ummet Ozcan. Asonn closed and headlined festival "Westlandse Cross" near his home town in 2017.

Discography

Singles 

2014

 Jacob van Hage & Asonn  - Drumrave [Mixmash Records]

2015

 Bobby Burns & Asonn feat. Massive Vibes - Sahara [Wall Recordings (Spinnin')]

2016

 No Mondays & Asonn ft. MC Ambush  - Pyro [Wall Recordings (Spinnin')]
 Asonn & Jimmy Clash - Shaigon [Armada]
 Thomas Newson & Asonn feat. Brad Mair - Home Is Where The Heart Is [Revealed Recordings]
 Asonn - Banga (Thomas Newson Edit) [Revealed Recordings]

2019

 Asonn - Running [DLDK Music (Armada)]

2020

 Tidalwave & Asonn - Save Me [DLDK Music (Armada)]
 Asonn - Oslo Opera [Green Room (Smash The House)]
 Asonn - Want That [Smash Deep (Smash The House)]
 Asonn - Dagga [Revealed Recordings]

Remixes 
2015

 Bobby Burns feat. Hannah Robinson - Satellites (Asonn Remix)

Production and songwriting credits 
2015

 Dee - This Christmas (Credits: co-production)
 Dee - You (Credits: co-production)
 Heineken | Ibiza Final 2015 (UEFA Champions League) (Credits: production)

2016

 Third Party & Sem Vox - Never Let You Go [DLDK Music (Armada)] (Credits: co-production)

2017

 R-Wan feat. Farah Ash - Sexual Chemistry [Lightstate Music] (Credits: production, songwriting)

2018

 Sem Vox - Disarm [DLDK Music (Armada)] (Credits: co-production, songwriting)

References

External links 
 Official website

Dutch electronic musicians
21st-century Dutch musicians
1994 births
Living people